Ponchard is a surname. Notable people with the surname include:

 Antoine Ponchard  (1787–1866), French operatic tenor and teacher
 Des Ponchard (1902–1983), Australian rugby league player
 Stan Ponchard (1924–2000), Australian rugby league player